The Australian Women's Amateur Stroke Play Championship was a national amateur golf championship played in Australia between 1992 and 2011. From 2008 to 2011, the stroke play championship also acted as the qualification event for the Australian Women's Amateur.

Winners

Source

See also
Australian Women's Amateur

References

External links

Amateur golf tournaments in Australia
Women's golf in Australia